Anthony Kirkland (born September 13, 1968) is an American serial killer. Between 2006 and 2009, Kirkland murdered two women and two girls in the Cincinnati area, following a 16-year prison term for the 1987 killing of his girlfriend.

Early life
Kirkland experienced physical and mental abuse as a child, his lawyers claim.

1987 killing 

On May 20, 1987, Kirkland raped and murdered his girlfriend, Leola Douglas, after she refused to have sex with him. He then set her body on fire to conceal evidence of the rape. Kirkland pleaded guilty to voluntary manslaughter and was sentenced to 10 to 25 years in prison.

Kirkland obtained his GED and an Associate degree in prison. However, he had multiple infractions in prison. Between 1998 and 2003, Kirkland was placed in solitary confinement 21 times for "disciplinary control." In the last nine months of his time in prison, he was sent to solitary four times for breaking the rules or fighting other inmates.

Kirkland was initially denied parole due to the severity of his crimes. However, he benefitted from a ruling by the Ohio Supreme Court declaring that parole-eligible inmates had to be judged by their conviction and not just the crime. Therefore, Kirkland was subject to more lenient guidelines for a voluntary manslaughter conviction. Kirkland was paroled in 2004, having served 16 years of his sentence.

20062009 murders 

From May 4, 2006, through March 7, 2009, Kirkland murdered four females (two women and two teenagers), three of them by strangulation. In each case, he had burned his victim's body to conceal evidence of rape.   Kirkland was arrested near the scene of his last murder victim in possession of her watch and iPod.

Victims 

Kirkland's five victims were:

 Leola Douglas, age 27, killed May 20, 1987;
 Casonya Crawford, age 14, murdered May 4, 2006;
 Mary Jo Newton, age 45, murdered June 14, 2006;
 Kimya Rolison, age 25, murdered December 22, 2006; and
 Esme Kenney, age 13, murdered March 7, 2009.

Trial 

On the morning of his trial, Kirkland entered a plea guilty to the murder and abuse-of-a-corpse charges relating to Mary Jo Newton and Kimya Rolison. On March 12, 2010, the jury found Kirkland guilty on all the remaining counts, including all the death-penalty specifications. The jury recommended a sentence of death. He was sentenced to death on March 31, 2010.

The court sentenced Kirkland to death for the aggravated murder of Esme Kenney (while committing or attempting to commit rape) and for the aggravated murder of Casonya Crawford (while committing or attempting to commit a robbery). The court also sentenced Kirkland to 70 years to life for the murders of Mary Jo Newton and Kimya Rolison.

Kirkland is presently incarcerated at Chillicothe Correctional Institution in Ohio.

Appeals 
On May 13, 2014, the Supreme Court of Ohio upheld Kirkland's conviction and death sentence.

On October 16, 2014, the Supreme Court of Ohio granted a motion by Kirkland for a stay of execution.

On April 6, 2015, the U.S. Supreme Court refused to hear Kirkland's appeal.

In May 2016, the Supreme Court of Ohio granted a motion for a new sentencing hearing for Kirkland.

On November 9, 2017, Perry Ancona and Norm Aubin, Kirkland's most recent attorneys, successfully requested to Judge Patrick Dinkelacker of the Hamilton County Court of Common Pleas that they be removed from the case. According to them and prosecutor Mark Piepmeier, an attorney with the state public defender's office who is not Kirkland's attorney of record has been discussing the case and his sentencing with him.

Kirkland's resentencing hearing began with opening statements on July 25, 2018. On August 6, 2018, the jury recommended that Kirkland should be sentenced to death.

On August 28, 2018, a Hamilton County judge agreed with the jury's recommendation and sentenced Kirkland to death. He is on death row at the Chillicothe Correctional Institution.

See also 
 List of death row inmates in the United States
 List of serial killers in the United States

References 

1968 births
20th-century American criminals
21st-century American criminals
American male criminals
American murderers of children
American people convicted of murder
American prisoners sentenced to death
American rapists
American serial killers
Living people
Male serial killers
People convicted of murder by Ohio
Place of birth missing (living people)
Prisoners sentenced to death by Ohio
Violence against women in the United States